The 2019–20 season was AS Saint-Étienne's 86th season in existence and the club's 16th consecutive season in the top flight of French football. In addition to the domestic league, Saint-Étienne participated in this season's editions of the Coupe de la Ligue, the UEFA Europa League, and also participated in the Coupe de France. The season covered the period from 1 July 2019 to 24 July 2020.

In early October 2019, Claude Puel was appointed as new coach after a series of poor results succeeding the sacked Ghislain Printant.

Players

Squad
As of 18 January 2020.

Out on loan

Reserve squad
As of 22 November 2018

Transfers

In

Out

Pre-season and friendlies

Competitions

Overview

Ligue 1

League table

Results summary

Results by round

Matches
The Ligue 1 schedule was announced on 14 June 2019. The Ligue 1 matches were suspended by the LFP on 13 March 2020 due to COVID-19 until further notices. On 28 April 2020, it was announced that Ligue 1 and Ligue 2 campaigns would not resume, after the country banned all sporting events until September. On 30 April, The LFP ended officially the 2019–20 season.

Coupe de France

Coupe de la Ligue

UEFA Europa League

Group stage

Statistics

Squad statistics

Goalscorers

Clean sheets

Notes

References

External links

AS Saint-Étienne seasons
AS Saint-Étienne